Linden is a suburb of Johannesburg, South Africa - situated towards the north western suburbs of the city on the border of the former independent town of Randburg. A number of shops, churches and schools can be found on 3rd Avenue and 4th Avenue. Attractions include arts, crafts, studios, coffee shops, pubs, restaurants and small shops. Bordering suburbs include Northcliff, Blairgowrie, Victory Park, Greenside and Cresta.

History
Prior to the discovery of gold on the Witwatersrand in 1886, the suburb lay on land on one of the original farms called Klipfontein. It became a suburb in 1901 and possibly named Johannes van der Linde who laid out the land with Lourens Geldenhuys. Prior to the land being surveyed, it was used to grow fruit. In 1937, it became part of the City of Johannesburg.

References

External links
 Map of Linden

Johannesburg Region B